The description Paris of the North has been applied to a large number of locations, including:

Aalborg, Denmark
Dawson City, Yukon, Canada
Newcastle, England, United Kingdom
Riga, Latvia
Saint Petersburg, Russia
Szczecin, Poland
Tromsø, Norway
Turku, Finland
Warsaw, Poland (until 1945)

See also
 Paris of the West
 Paris of the East
 Paris of the South
 Paris of the plains
 Paris of the Prairies
 Little Paris (disambiguation)
 Venice of the North

References

Lists of cities by nickname